Lamor is a Finnish family-owned company focusing on environmental services and products. In 2020, Lamor's key business areas included oil spill response, waste management and water treatment. Lamor's products are used in over a hundred countries, and there are subsidiaries in Bolivia, China, Great Britain, Guyana, India, Kazakhstan, Colombia, Oman, Peru, Russia, Saudi Arabia, Turkey and Ukraine and the United States.

The main owner of Lamor Corporation Ab is the Larsen family. The company's name Lamor is an acronym made up of the words Larsen Marine Oil Recovery.

History

1982–1999 

Lamor, which focused on the shipping industry, was founded in 1982. Lamor's roots are in the shipping and dockyard company Oy Böge Larsen Ab, whose owner Böge Larsen sold the majority of his company to Starckjohann-Telco in the same year. The boat department, Larsen Marine Ab, remained in the ownership of the family, and Bent Larsen, Böge Larsen's son, was appointed as managing director. At first, Larsen Marine offered winter storage for small boats and ship repair.

Lamor subcontracted the manufacture of all its products, and in the early 1980s, the company had only three employees, who took care of sales and marketing. Lamor collected product ideas from potential customers, among others.

After the shipyard crisis of the early 1990s and the collapse of the Soviet Union Lamor switched industry to oil spill response, because it had developed and patented a brush skimmer. For example, the Finnish Ministry of the Environment purchased oil spill response equipment from Lamor for the Baltic countries. Equipment was also purchased for Poland and Sweden.

In 1995, the company name was shortened to Lamor.

2000–2009 

In 2002, Lamor had 18 employees. The main products of the company were oil booms, recovery equipment, pumps and oil recovery vessels. In August, it acquired the business of its competitor, the Loviisa-based LMP Patents Ltd Oy (Lori) operating in the oil spill response field, and its approximately 150 patents related to oil spill response. Lamor also acquired the British company GT Pollution Tech Ltd focusing on various types of oil spill response equipment. The acquisitions made the company the world's largest provider of oil spill response equipment. Lamor's turnover was approximately 13 million euros.

In 2004, Lamor boasted a new subsidiary in the United States, while its Chinese subsidiary was about two years old. Lamor was the biggest company selling oil spill response systems to China.

In 2005, Lamor entered into an agreement on the environmental protection of the most important oil production area in Russia. The business operations of the Russian company Yukos Service Ecologia, which was previously responsible for environmental protection in the Nefteyugansk oil production area, together with its 250 employees, equipment and operating network, were transferred to Lamor.

In January 2006, Bent Larsen, CEO of Lamor Corporation Ab, said Lamor had developed a concept in which oil spill response equipment would be centralised in a stockpile at a regional response centre, where it could be rented or sold to customers. Shipping companies, oil companies and other operators in the field were sought to finance the concept. The oil spill response centre would be owned by a company specifically founded for that purpose, the shareholders of which could be, for example, equipment manufacturers from the industry, companies using its services, and external investors. The centre would also train the personnel needed for oil spill response. In February, Lamor offered the Finnish Ministry of the Environment an agreement on improving Finland's oil spill response capabilities. The Ministry of the Environment and Sitra commissioned an external study on the project. Lamor had its own sales offices in China, England, India, the United States and Russia, and close to 200 subcontractors, the majority of which were located in Southern Finland. It had centralised the majority of purchases to ten of its most important subcontractors. The Lamor brand was used to sell hundreds of product versions from oil recovery vessels to purification area luminaires. The oil brush skimmer, based on the company's own patent and design, was sold for offshore use. In September, Lamor incorporated its business operations into separate companies. Lamor Corporation Ab and its subsidiaries focused on the development and sales of oil spill response equipment and systems. The new company, Clean Globe International Ltd, was responsible for the oil spill response centres and environmental protection projects. At the same time, the subcontracting of Lamor's oil spill response equipment and other equipment was transferred to a separate company, Lamor Technics, whose main shareholders were Lamor Corporation Ab and Factorix Oy from Porvoo.

In December 2007, Lamor acquired Tarwell Oy from Raisio.

In March 2008, together with Swire Pacific Offshore, Lamor founded a joint venture, Lamor Swire Environmental Solutions, which, among others, trained 1,500 sailors from Swire Pacific in oil spill response. In April, Clean Globe International, part of the Lamor Group, acquired a 26 percent stake in Ecoshelf Sahalin, an environmental protection company based on the Russian Sakhalin Island. In addition to oil spill response, it focused on waste management and other environmental protection services. At that time, the turnover of the company was approximately 20 million euros, and the company employed 200 people. In May, Lamor acquired the United States-based company Hyde Marine Inc, which manufactured systems and equipment which prevented the spreading of harmful fauna and marine plants from the ballast water of ships. Hyde Marine Inc was small in size, but Lamor believed in the rise of ballast water treatment systems market over the next ten years. In October, Lamor acquired Slickbar Products, based in the United States. Lamor's turnover was 36 million euros in the accounting period that ended in June 2008. The company's largest market area was Russia, which amounted to 40 percent of turnover. In 2008, Bent Larsen, the long-time CEO of Lamor, passed away.

In 2009, the Board of the Lamor Group appointed Kent Björklund as the CEO of the Group from inside the company. The Group had approximately 100 employees, in addition to which the global production network comprised approximately 200 people.

2010–current 
In April 2010, BP’s oil rig Deepwater Horizon exploded in the Gulf of Mexico and Lamor was called to the scene. During the summer, over 400 oil recovery units left Finland as air cargo for the coast of Louisiana. Hundreds of kilometres of oil booms were delivered from Lamor's Chinese plant, and equipment was also delivered from Lamor's other four equipment centres in England, Oman, Dubai and the United States. Of the oil recovery units used by BP, 60 percent were supplied by Lamor. While the disaster in the Gulf of Mexico was at its worst, Lamor was also fighting in four minor oil spills in China, Singapore, Egypt and Michigan in the United States. Due to the accident, Lamor's corporate structure was also modified, the Lamor Group and Lamor Corporation were merged, and Fred Larsen became CEO. Björklund continued as CEO of the affiliated company, Lamor Technics.

In 2011, Lamor participated in a competition intended for companies developing oil spill response technology, organised by the X-Prize Foundation from the United States. There were ten finalists, half from Europe and the other half from the United States. Through the competition, the foundation wanted to encourage companies to invest in research and product development. There were four significant oil spill response companies in the world, of which Lamor was the largest. The market size was approximately 300 million euros, and dozens of smaller companies also operated in it.

In March 2012, Suomen Teollisuussijoitus Oy and Etera made a minority investment in Lamor Corporation Ab. In August, Etteplan and Lamor said they would jointly develop a skimmer system for oil spill response purposes. The new oil spill response system features a skimmer, a skimmer-lifting mechanism, mounting equipment and boom, all of which can be packed into one movable 20-foot container and installed on any flat-deck vessel. Previous skimmer systems were designed to be fixed installations on specific oil recovery vessels.

In 2015, Lamor invested in Corena from Ecuador, which produced environmental services.

In March 2016, Lamor entered into a cooperation agreement with the Norwegian Markleen, which focused on offshore oil recovery. Also a Lamor spin-off company, Hailer, was founded to produce a digital customer relationship management platform (CRM).

In spring 2017, Lamor and the Russian state energy company Rosneft signed a letter of intent to assess the potential for the localisation of arctic area oil spill response equipment in Russia. The goal of the parties was to start jointly producing oil spill response equipment, oil booms and other equipment and components in Russia.

In April 2018, Lamor Corporation stated its intent to purchase the business operations related to SeaHow oil spill response equipment from Meritaito Oy.

In February 2020 the company made waste management and water treatment into their own business areas, in addition to oil spill response. In March, Lamor's subsidiary Corena Group Ab was merged with the parent company, Lamor Corporation. In December, Lamor Corporation was one of the four winners of the competitive bidding on growth engines organised by Business Finland. Together with their network, companies are pursuing a new innovation-based business worth at least one billion euros. The winners were granted a government capital loan to enable the platform company to develop its ecosystem. In its own project, Lamor will pursue a decrease in the amount of waste in water, focusing on outlets into seas.

Organisation 
Lamor is headquartered in Finland and it has 10 subsidiaries around the world. They are located in Bolivia, Brazil, Great Britain, China, Colombia, Oman, Peru, Turkey, Russia and the United States. In 2020, the company was planning new subsidiaries in Guyana, India, Saudi Arabia, and Senegal  and it employed 350 people.

Since 1980s, Lamor has developed its business models within network business. Founded in 2016, Lamor's spin-off company Hailer has developed a digital platform for customer relationship management. In 2019, at its Rihkamatori headquarters, the company moved to a so-called coworking model, where people from different companies work in shared, communal office space. In the 2020s, the company started to shift its business towards platform economy and ecosystem business models. Lamor Corporation acts as a platform company, developing the business of its ecosystem, for example, in water purification.

Products and services 

In 2020, Lamor had three business areas: oil spill response, waste management and water treatment. In 2016, Lamor's product portfolios included over 800 different products, many of which were patented. Lamor designs the products that are then manufactured by an extensive network of subcontractors.

Lamor has invented simple technical solutions for oil spilled in the sea like the brush skimmer. In 2018, Lamor was responsible for approximately 40 percent of the global oil spill response market needs, and it operated in 94 countries.

Lamor has supplied oil spill response equipment to, among others, the oil ports of Primorsk and Vysotsk, as well as to the Siberian oil drilling areas, where Lamor has also participated in oil recovery and soil remediation operations. Lamor was also involved in cleaning in the Gulf of Mexico oil disaster in 2010, when it supplied 60 percent of the oil recovery equipment used in the area. Lamor also took part in the 1989 Exxon Valdez oil spill response operations.

Acknowledgements 

 Lamor was awarded company of the year in 2003 in Uusimaa region of Finland.
 In 2004, Lamor Corporation Ab received the year 2004 national entrepreneur award and the Internationalisation Award of the President of the Republic.

References 

Companies of Finland
Finnish companies established in 1982
Porvoo